Edson Araújo da Silva (born July 26, 1980), known as Edson Araújo, is a Brazilian footballer who plays as a forward.

His previous clubs include Daejeon Citizen in South Korea, Sivasspor in Turkey, Omiya Ardija in Japan, Fortaleza Esporte Clube, Santa Cruz Futebol Clube, Clube Atlético Mineiro, Sport Club Corinthians Paulista and Associação Portuguesa de Desportos.

Club statistics

References

External links
 
 
 

1980 births
Brazilian footballers
Brazilian expatriate footballers
Association football forwards
Living people
Associação Portuguesa de Desportos players
Fortaleza Esporte Clube players
Sport Club Corinthians Paulista players
Clube Atlético Mineiro players
Santa Cruz Futebol Clube players
São José Esporte Clube players
Rio Branco Esporte Clube players
Paysandu Sport Club players
Omiya Ardija players
Sivasspor footballers
Daejeon Hana Citizen FC players
Emirates Club players
J2 League players
K League 1 players
Expatriate footballers in the United Arab Emirates
Expatriate footballers in Turkey
Expatriate footballers in South Korea
Expatriate footballers in Japan
Brazilian expatriate sportspeople in South Korea
Brazilian expatriate sportspeople in the United Arab Emirates
UAE First Division League players
Footballers from São Paulo